The Alabama Stakes is an American Thoroughbred horse race open to three-year-old fillies. Inaugurated in 1872, the Grade I race is run over a distance of one and one-quarter miles on the dirt track at Saratoga Race Course. Held in mid August, it currently offers a purse of $600,000. In 2010 it became the third leg of the American Triple Tiara of Thoroughbred Racing, after the Acorn Stakes and Coaching Club American Oaks.

The Alabama Stakes is named in honor of William Cottrell of Mobile, Alabama. "Alabama" was the name settled on because Cottrell was too modest to have a race named for him personally. The inaugural running took place on July 19, 1872 and was won by a chestnut filly named Woodbine owned by prominent New York financier August Belmont Sr.

The race was not run from 1893 to 1896 and 1898 to 1900. The 1908 passage of the Hart–Agnew anti-betting legislation by the New York Legislature under Republican Governor Charles Evans Hughes led to a state-wide shutdown of racing in 1911 and 1912.  During World War II, from 1943 through 1945 the Alabama Stakes was run at Belmont Park.

The race has been contested at various distances: 
1 mile and 1 furlong – 1872–1901, 1904, 1906–1916
 miles – 1901, 1902, and on the turf in 1903
 miles – 1905
 miles – 1917 to present

Records
Speed record at current distance: 
 2:00.80 @ 1¼ miles : Go For Wand (1990)

Most wins by an owner:
 5 – Belair Stud (1924, 1942, 1944, 1946, 1953)
 4 – Walter M. Jeffords (1937, 1949, 1951, 1952)

Most wins by a jockey:
 5 – Jorge Velásquez (1972, 1973, 1977, 1984, 1987)
 5 – Jerry D. Bailey (1997, 1998, 1999, 2001, 2005)
 5 – Mike E. Smith (1993, 1994, 1995, 2000, 2016)

Most wins by a trainer:
 8 – Sunny Jim Fitzsimmons (1924, 1928, 1942, 1944, 1946, 1950, 1953, 1959)

Winners

+ In 1968 Heartland finished first but was disqualified and placed second.
+ In 1966 Lady Pitt finished first but was disqualified and placed second.
+ In 1942 Bonnet Ann finished first but was disqualified and placed last.
+ In 1908 Stamina finished first but was disqualified and placed last.

External links
Ten Things You Should Know About the Alabama Stakes at Hello Race Fans

References

Graded stakes races in the United States
Flat horse races for three-year-old fillies
Grade 1 stakes races in the United States
Horse races in New York (state)
Saratoga Race Course
1872 establishments in New York (state)
Recurring sporting events established in 1872
Triple Tiara of Thoroughbred Racing